Chakaia Booker (born 1953 in Newark, New Jersey) is an American sculptor known for creating monumental, abstract works for both the gallery and outdoor public spaces.  Booker’s works are contained in more than 40 public collections and have been exhibited across the United States, Europe, Africa, and Asia.  Booker was included in the 2000 Whitney Biennial, received a Guggenheim Fellowship in 2005, and an American Academy of Arts and Letters Award for Art in 2001.  Booker has lived and worked in New York City’s East Village since the early 1980s and maintains a production studio in Allentown, Pennsylvania.

Booker is best known for her innovative and signature use of recycled rubber tires, her primary sculptural material.  Rubber has provided Booker with the ability to work in a modular format at a monumental scale while maintaining a fluid movement and gestural feel.  Throughout her career, Booker has consistently used stainless steel and fabric to create sculptural works in addition to rubber tires. In 2009, Booker began an in depth exploration of printmaking creating a significant body of graphic works, largely focused on the process of chine collé.  Booker’s approach to printmaking processes is reminiscent of her modular working methods in sculpture.  Printmaking has become a regular part of Booker’s artistic output, and as with her use of rubber, Booker has invented unique ways of manipulating materials and process.

Early life and education
Chakaia Booker was born in 1953 in Newark, New Jersey and raised in neighboring East Orange, New Jersey. She learned to sew from her grandmother, aunt, and sister. Fixing, repairing, and manipulating materials early in life was foundational to Booker’s later approach to wearable art, ceramics, and sculpture, specifically with the use of pattern, repetition, and modular construction.

Booker received a BA in sociology from Rutgers University in 1976 and an MFA from the City College of New York in 1993. She has studied African dance, ceramics, weaving, basketry, and t'ai chi, all of which have influenced her art.

She has lived and worked in New York City’s East Village since the early 1980s. In the 1990s, she began working with discarded construction materials and rubber tires, which evolved into her artistic style. She maintains a production studio in Allentown, Pennsylvania for fabrication of large-scale and public works. Booker has served on the boards of the International Sculpture Center and Socrates Sculpture Park.

Career 

Beginning in the 1980s, Booker created wearable sculptures which she could place herself inside and utilize as clothing. "The wearable garment sculpture was about getting energy and feeling from a desired design." In the early 1990s, Booker began to create large outdoor sculptures from discarded materials found at construction sites, including rubber tires, a medium in which she continues to work. The various tire tread patterns, colors, and widths create a palette for Booker similar to the palette of a painter. Booker's use of tires suggest a range of aesthetic, political, cultural, and economic concerns. They may be considered a reference to the urban landscape of Northern New Jersey or a reminder how modes of transportation have changed since the industrial age. The tire sculptures may also be considered to address African American identity: their varying pigments and textures can be interpreted as a representation of the range of African American skin tones, and their resiliency has been viewed as "a compelling metaphor of African American survival in the modern world." Tire tread patterns in her work may also refer to elements of African culture, including scarification, body painting, and traditional textiles.

Booker's work also deals with themes of class, labor, and gender. Booker's "Echoes in Black (Industrial Cicatrization)" from the 2000 Whitney Biennial deals with the emotional and physical scarification that people experience in life. Her piece "No More Milk and Cookies" from 2003 "questions our commercially driven society and what happens when consumption is prohibited." Her 2001 piece "Wench (Wrench) III" is a surrealistic sculpture that subverts a very masculine mechanic's wrench into a feminine feather boa. The piece "Spirit Hunter" is reminiscent of images of life and death, as well as a feminist approach to birth and sexuality.

Works and exhibits
Chakaia Booker currently works and resides in New York City. Her work is part of the permanent collection at the Metropolitan Museum of Art, the Akron Art Museum, Cornell University's Johnson Museum of Art, The Max Protetch and June Kelly galleries in New York, and others. She has participated in both group and solo exhibitions in such places as the Neuberger Museum of Art, the Akron Museum of Art, Marlborough gallery, the Sandler Hudson Gallery in Atlanta, Georgia, and the PS 1 Contemporary Art Center in Queens, as well as in the "Twentieth Century American Sculpture" exhibition held at the White House in 1996. On June 22, 2008, Booker unveiled "Chaikaia Booker: Mass Transit" in Indianapolis, Indiana. This public art exhibition featured 10 sculptures "created by the artist following her visit to Indianapolis and her researching of the city's history and heritage."

The National Museum of Women in the Arts has exhibited her works in The New York Avenue Sculpture Project (2012), FOREFRONT: Chakaia Booker (2006), and Reaching for the Stars through Art (1998). The Georgia Museum of Art in Athens, GA also exhibited her work in an exhibition entitled Defiant Beauty, which was on display from April 2012 – 2013. Several of her works were also on display in New York City's Garment District from June–November 2014. Booker is one of nine contemporary artists with work on display at the Renwick Gallery's Wonder Gallery in the Smithsonian American Art Museum in Washington D.C. The sculpture on display was "It's So Hard to be Green," which was also exhibited at the 2000 Whitney Museum Biennial. Booker's sculpture Position Preferred was on view at the McNay Art Museum in 2020.

In May 2021, her exhibition "Chakaia Booker: The Observance" went on display at the Institute of Contemporary Art in Miami. In 2021, Oklahoma Contemporary displayed her Shaved Portions exhibit.

Notable works in public collections

Shhh (1992), Pyramid Hill Sculpture Park and Museum, Hamilton, Ohio
Mother and Child (1994), Zimmerli Art Museum at Rutgers University, New Brunswick, New Jersey
Blue Bell (1998), Allen Memorial Art Museum, Oberlin, Ohio
Egress (c. 2000), National Gallery of Art, Washington, D.C.
Sweet Dreams (2000), Brooklyn Museum, New York
When Thoughts Collide (2000), Herbert F. Johnson Museum of Art, Ithaca, New York
Acid Rain (2001), National Museum of Women in the Arts, Washington, D.C.
El Gato (2001), Kemper Museum of Contemporary Art, Kansas City, Missouri
India Blue (2001), Flint Institute of Arts, Michigan
It's Like This (2001), Birmingham Museum of Art, Alabama
Little Red Riding Hood (2001), Philander Smith College, Little Rock, Arkansas
Raw Attraction (2001), Metropolitan Museum of Art, New York
Urban Butterfly (2001), Davis Museum at Wellesley College, Wellesley, Massachusetts
Urban Mask (2001), National Museum of African American History and Culture, Smithsonian Institution. Washington, D.C.
Untitled (2002), Memphis Brooks Museum of Art, Memphis, Tennessee
A Moment in Time (2004), Storm King Art Center, New Windsor, New York
Echoing Factors (2004), Brooklyn College Library, City University of New York
Quality Time (2004), Rhode Island School of Design Museum, Providence; Whitney Museum, New York; and Yale University Art Gallery, New Haven, Connecticut
Rendezvous (2004), Frederik Meijer Gardens and Sculpture Park, Grand Rapids, Michigan
Urban Excursion (2004), Frederik Meijer Gardens and Sculpture Park, Grand Rapids, Michigan
Position Preferred (2006), McNay Art Museum, San Antonio
Remembering Columbia (2006), NASA Art Program, National Aeronautics and Space Administration, Washington, D.C.
Four Twenty One (2010), David C. Driskell Center, University of Maryland, College Park; and Yale University Art Gallery, New Haven, Connecticut
Untitled (2011), Davis Museum at Wellesley College, Wellesley, Massachusetts; and Library of Congress, Washington, D.C.
The Liquidity of Legacy (2016), National Museum of African American History and Culture, Smithsonian Institution, Washington, D.C.

Awards, commissions, and residencies

Selected awards and residencies
Merit Award in Public Art, Keep Indianapolis Beautiful, Inc., Indianapolis, 2008
Fellowship for Fine Arts, John Simon Guggenheim Memorial Foundation, New York City, 2005
Design Award, Art Commission of the City of New York, New York City, 2005
Grant, Pollock-Krasner Foundation, New York City, 2002
Arts and Letters Award, Academy of Arts and Letters, New York City, 2001
Grant, Anonymous Was A Woman Award, New York City, 2000
Inclusion in the Whitney Biennial, Whitney Museum of American Art, New York City, 2000
Award, Johnnie L. Cochran, Jr. Art Fund, New York City, 1999
Gregory Millard Fellow: Sculpture, New York Foundation for the Arts, New York City, 1997
The Joan Mitchell Foundation, Painters and Sculptors Grant, New York City, 1995
Artist-in-Residence, The Studio Museum in Harlem, New York City, 1995
Commission, NASA Art Program, National Museum of Women in the Arts, Washington, D.C., 1994
Therese Ralston McCabe Connor Award, City College of New York, New York City, 1992
Grant, Artists Space, New York City, 1988

Selected commissions
National Museum of African American History and Culture, Washington, D.C., 2016
Millennium Park, Chicago, 2016
Renwick Gallery, Washington, D.C., 2015
Weeksville Heritage Center, Brooklyn, 2013

References

Further reading 
Arango, Jorge. "Elevating the Everyday: Sculpture Chakaia Booker". Essence November 2003, 146
Castro, John Gardener "The Language of Life: Chakaia Booker". Sculpture (Washington D.C.) January/February 2003, 28-33
"Chakaia Booker", 2007, Decordova Sculpture Park Online, 2007, (21 March 2007)
"Chakaia Booker", 2007 Marlborough Gallery Online, 2007  (21 March 2007)
Glueck, Grace; "Art InReview; Chakaia Booker," The New York Times, 16 March 2001,
Lewis, Samella S.; African American Art and Artists. Berkeley: University of California Press, 1990
Nichols, Mathew Guy; "Chakaia Booker:Material Matters", Art In America, June/July 2004, 164-169
Sanders, Phil and David Krut Projects (Gallery). Chakaia Booker: Print Me. New York: David Krut Publishing. 2012
Wei, Lilly; "Queen of Rubber Soul", Art News, January 2002, 88-90
Wilkinson, Michelle; Material girls : contemporary Black women artists: Reginald F. Lewis Museum of Maryland African American History & Culture, 2011, 18-19

External links 
Chakaia Booker website

1953 births
Living people
City College of New York alumni
Artists from Newark, New Jersey
Rutgers University alumni
African-American contemporary artists
American contemporary artists
American women printmakers
21st-century American women artists
20th-century American women artists
Afrofuturists
20th-century American sculptors
American installation artists
American women sculptors
African-American sculptors
African-American women artists
Artists from New Jersey
Artists from New York City
Recycled art artists
21st-century American sculptors
Black feminism
African-American printmakers
20th-century African-American women
20th-century African-American people
20th-century African-American artists
21st-century African-American women
21st-century African-American artists
Artists from Allentown, Pennsylvania